Nag Hammadi is a city in Upper Egypt.
It had a population of close to 43,000 .

History
The town of Nag Hammadi was found on the site of older villages Ansan and al-Luaqi in the 19th century and was named after its founder, Mahmoud Pasha Hammadi, a member of the Hammadi family in Sohag, Egypt. Mahmoud Pasha Hammadi was a major landholder in Sohag, and known for his strong opposition to the British rule in Egypt beginning in 1882.

The "Nag Hammadi Library", an important collection of 2nd-century Gnostic texts, was found at 
Jabal al-Ṭārif near Nag Hammadi in 1945.

The city was the site of the Nag Hammadi Massacre in January 2010, in which eight Coptic Christians were shot dead by three men. In total, nineteen Coptic Christians were attacked.

Economy
Sugar and aluminium are produced in Nag Hammadi. The Nag Hammadi Sugar factory was built in 1895-1897 by French contractors Cail and Fives. It is still in operation in 2018. Egyptalum is one of the largest aluminium producer in the Middle East. Wood particleboard is manufactured from sugar cane bagasse.

See also

 List of cities and towns in Egypt
 Nag Hammadi library

References

Populated places in Qena Governorate

cs:Rukopisy z Nag Hammádí